Ketchikan (YTB-795) was a United States Navy  named for Ketchikan, Alaska.

Construction

The contract for Ketchikan was awarded 15 June 1967. She was laid down on 18 December 1967 at Marinette, Wisconsin, by Marinette Marine and launched 11 June 1968.

Operational history
Ketchikan served as a harbor tug at Naval Station Guam, Marianas Islands.

Stricken from the Navy List 5 June 2001, Ketchikan was sunk during fleet training exercises 25 April 2003.

References

External links

 

 

1968 ships
+
Natick-class large harbor tugs
Ships built by Marinette Marine